Grandson, Vol. 1 is the debut mixtape by American rapper King Von. It was released through Only the Family Entertainment/Empire on September 20, 2019. Executively produced by Chopsquad DJ, it features guest appearances from Lil Durk and Booka600. The project peaked at number 53 on the Billboard 200.

Track listing

Charts

References

2019 albums
Empire Distribution albums
King Von albums